Walking with Cavemen is a 2003 four-part nature documentary television miniseries produced by the BBC Natural History Unit, the Discovery Channel and ProSieben. Walking with Cavemen explores human evolution, showcasing various extinct hominin species and their inferred behaviours and social dynamics. The original British version of the series is presented by the British researcher Robert Winston; in the American version Winston's appearances and narration is replaced with narration by Alec Baldwin.

Walking with Cavemen is the third installment in the Walking with... series of documentaries, following on from Walking with Dinosaurs (1999) and Walking with Beasts (2001), and like its predecessors uses computer-generated imagery and animatronics, as well as live action footage shot at various locations, to reconstruct prehistoric life and environments. In order to ensure that Walking with Cavemen was consistent with scientific understanding of human evolution and that it portrayed the time periods and locations accurately, the production team employed a team of 111 scientists from various fields to advise on the series.

In addition to the techniques also used in previous series, Walking with Cavemen uses actors to portray extinct hominins since it was deemed impossible to evoke convincing human expressions and emotions using just computer graphics. The hominins in the series were portrayed by fourteen different actors wearing makeup and prosthetics. The series garnered a positive reception among both critics and scientists. Though there were concerns of conjecture being presented as fact, the series was praised for making the scientific theories concerning human evolution accessible to a wider audience. A companion book, Walking with Cavemen: Stand Eye-to-Eye with your Ancestors, was also released in 2003 and received positive reviews.

Premise 
Walking with Cavemen follows the previous series Walking with Dinosaurs (1999) and Walking with Beasts (2001) in showcasing prehistoric life in a nature documentary style. Beginning in Ethiopia 3.2 million years ago, Walking with Cavemen follows the story of human evolution through exploring key developments on the path from Australopithecus afarensis to modern humans. The programme often focuses on particular characters and their relationships to each other in order to be more accessible to viewers.

Production 
Partly due to some of the scientific criticism that had been leveled at previous installments in the Walking with... franchise of documentaries, the production team of Walking with Cavemen recruited a large team of 111 scientists from various fields to advise on the series. The scientific team included experts on stone tools, geologists, primatologists, geneticists and climatologists, among others.

Like previous Walking with... series, Walking with Cavemen employed both computer graphics and animatronics to recreate prehistoric life. When possible, footage of actual live animals was used but other creatures, such as mammoths, had to be recreated through computer graphics. The visual effects were, as for previous series in the franchise, created by the visual effects company Framestore. Walking with Cavemen pioneered a new visual technique, the "deep timelapse", in which scenes of climate, environmental and geological change spanning millions of years were put in a timelapse to only take a few moments.

The title Walking with Cavemen was settled upon during production. The title was chosen to appeal to the outdated stereotype of human ancestors being cave-dwellers (the programme does not portray hominins in caves until the last episode) in order to turn viewer's expectations on their head and showcase that the past was not necessarily what they imagined it to be. It was determined to begin the series with Australopithecus afarensis, at the time of production the best-documented early hominid. The behaviour of the Australopithecus portrayed in the series was modelled on chimpanzees and was particularly inspired by the chimpanzee research of Jane Goodall.

The BBC referred to Walking with Cavemen as one of its "most ambitious TV science projects". In total, the series cost £4 million to make. It was the first installment in the Walking with... franchise to not involve Tim Haines, the creator of the franchise. Walking with Cavemen was instead created by Richard Dale, who served as executive producer and director, and Peter Georgi, who served as series producer. Both Dale and Georgi had a background in documentary filmmaking and had, among other projects, previously worked together on the 2001 documentary film The Human Body.

Casting and hominin costumes 

Although prehistoric animals had been created mostly through computer graphics in Walking with Dinosaurs and Walking with Beasts, it was difficult to produce hominins through this method that were realistic in appearance, expression and movement. In particular no amount of computer graphics would have been able to convincingly portray emotions and allow audiences to determine how the hominins were feeling from looking in their eyes. Failure to convincingly portray human movement and expressions would have broken the "magic" Walking with Cavemen sought to create. As a result, the production team decided to use actors in makeup and prosthetics to portray human ancestors. Over 2,000 actors applied to join the series, out of which fourteen were selected. The fourteen actors had to spend five weeks with scientific experts as well as movement and voice coaches to recreate the early hominins. The complicated training programme was deemed to be necessary since an actor acting in the wrong way would easily have broken the illusion of the programme.

Using actors presented a challenge since special effects had to be employed to change the look of both their faces and their bodies to match the appearance of the hominins they were portraying. The costumes were created using the best available scientific evidence. A massive amount of prosthetics, well over 1,500 pieces, were created and used during filming alongside other components and animatronics. The makeup effects were created by David White and Sacha Carter (Altered States FX) and the prosthetics were created by numerous artists, including Nik Williams, Matthew Smith (Animated Extras) and Barrie Gower (BGFX). The makeup process for the actors took five hours every morning of filming and some of the costumes made it difficult to perform tasks unrelated to the programme; actors in Paranthropus boisei costumes for instance found it difficult to eat their lunch and drinking was a problem in most of the costumes. Many actors used straws for all drinks.

During promotion of the series, the BBC did a publicity photoshoot with the actors David Rubin and Suzanne Cave, who among other roles portrayed elder male and female Homo ergaster, respectively.

Like The Giant Claw (2002) and Land of Giants (2003), special episodes of Walking with Dinosaurs, Walking with Cavemen includes a presenter rather than simply a narrator. The series is presented by the British researcher Robert Winston, who had previously hosted other BBC series on humans, such as Your Life in Their Hands (1979–1987), The Human Body (1998) and Child of Our Time (2000–2020). The American version of the programme replaced Winston's narration and appearances and was originally going to be hosted by Nigel Marven, who previously appeared in episodes of Walking with Dinosaurs and in the series Sea Monsters, but the production team eventually instead created a version hosted by the actor Alec Baldwin.

Filming 
Most of the footage of Walking with Cavemen was shot on location. The series was filmed over 41 days. The vast majority of the filming days, 29 days, were spent in South Africa; the other locations were Iceland (four days), Yorkshire (two days), Tunbridge Wells (one day) and the studio (five days). These locations in turn often included separate locations were up to four different units shot footage at the same time. In South Africa, Walking with Cavemen footage was filmed in the Southern Kalahari Desert, the Augrabies Falls National Park and the Orange River regions.

Filming in the Southern Kalahari Desert proved problematic for the actors, since temperatures could reach 30/40 °C (86/104 °F) and they wore full makeup and bodysuits. The team was as a result constantly accompanied by medical professionals who provided the actors with rehydrating solutions and salts.

Episodes 

The series was broadcast again in 2004 as a version split into two (rather than four) parts, each 50 minutes long. The new two-part version was narrated by the British actor Andrew Sachs.

Reception

Scientific and critical response 
The British anthropologist Clive Gamble gave Walking with Cavemen a positive review in the scientific journal Nature. Though finding several details questionable, such as Neanderthals being described as lacking imagination and not wearing boots, Homo ergaster not being black-skinned, and monogamy being showcased as a norm rather than a more recent concept, Gamble also felt that such criticisms missed the point of the programme. Gamble concluded that the point of the series was to introduce a wider audience to the scientific understanding of human evolution through keeping drama rather than scientific debate as the driving force and that the series had succeeded in this purpose. Gamble also enjoyed the inclusion of Robert Winston as presenter, referring to him as a "Dr Who of human evolution" who travelled through time and offered factoids and insight.

Writing for the Archaeological Institute of America, the British archaeologist Paul Bahn also gave the series a positive review, praising the workmanship that went into creating the costumes and calling the landscapes featured "spectacular". Bahn noted that most of what is shown in the series is pure speculation but considered Walking with Cavemen to be "well worth a look" and particularly praised how it made humanity's long dead ancestors feel "more real and alive".

Lynne Heffley of the Los Angeles Times also praised Walking with Cavemen, calling it a "fascinating exploration of human evolution". Heffley noted that the narrative at times grew "a tad overheated" and that "stiftly moving mouths" could detract from the otherwise excellent prosthetics but still considered the series an impressive effort "well worth the trip". The Australia-based British broadcaster Alan Saunders criticized the series for various events throughout being referred to as milestones on the path to Homo sapiens, which Saunders interpreted as veering close to suggesting that evolution was a process that would inevitably have led to modern humans.

Popular response 
In 2003, BBC News hosted a debate section where viewers could share their views on Walking with Cavemen, which attracted both positive and negative user responses. The negative user responses outweighed the positive ones, with some users being concerned that much of the programme appeared to be conjecture and that Robert Winston, or the programme as a whole, were dumbing down the science or "patronising" viewers. Some viewers found the hominin suits to be unconvincing and drew unfavourable comparisons to the original Planet of the Apes films. Several users also criticized the programme for presenting evolution as fact instead of considering the (pseudoscientific) idea of intelligent design. In an interview, Robert Winston dismissed fears of dumbing down the science, stating that "We are making it exciting, we are bringing science alive, and I absolutely disagree with the notion of dumbing down." Positive user responses mentioned that the programme made otherwise obscure science more accessible to the masses and praised the series combining a scientific and humanistic approach. Some users also praised the effects, including the hominin costumes, and the writing.

In other media

Companion book 
A companion book to the series, titled Walking with Cavemen: Stand Eye-to-Eye with your Ancestors, was co-authored by the photographer (and executive editor on the series) John Lynch and the professor of psychology and human evolution researcher Louise Barrett. The book is a coffee-table book which explores mankind's origins in a similar vein as the series, mixing imagined anecdotes and scientific fact together and using stills from the series to bring the ancient hominins to life. The book was reviewed positively in the book review magazine Publishers Weekly, which considered the book to have been "competently executed".

Interactive version 
Using BBCi (BBC Interative Television), viewers could during the programme's original airing watch Walking with Cavemen with additional layers of factual evidence, such as facts about fossils and comprehensive summaries of the science behind every episode. After every episode, the evidence shown would be drawn together into a 10-minute exclusive extra documentary.

Website 
An accompanying website to the series was launched in 2003, intended to act as a "stand-alone resource in its own right". The website included fact files on every hominin, family trees, summaries of the episodes, behind-the-scenes information and a flash game, Ape to Man, in which players played through seven tasks, each representing a milestone in human evolution.

See also
 A Species Odyssey a similar program on France 3
 Before We Ruled the Earth a two-part documentary aired on Discovery Channel

Notes

References

External links

 Walking with Cavemen - BBC Science & Nature

2003 British television series debuts
2003 British television series endings
BBC television documentaries
Discovery Channel original programming
Documentary films about prehistoric life
Prehistoric people in popular culture
Human evolution books
Walking with...
Documentary television shows about evolution